Dedni Dol is a settlement northwest of Višnja Gora in the Municipality of Ivančna Gorica in central Slovenia. The area is part of the historical region of Lower Carniola. The municipality is now included in the Central Slovenia Statistical Region. 

The local church is dedicated to Our Lady of Sorrows and belongs to the Parish of Višnja Gora. It dates to the 15th century with 18th-, 19th-, and 20th-century adaptations.

References

External links
Dedni Dol on Geopedia

Populated places in the Municipality of Ivančna Gorica